Kalyana Mandapam is a 1965 Indian Tamil-language historical drama film produced by Dhanalakshmi Theatres. The film was directed by Maa. Raa. and stars C. L. Anandan, Ravichandran, K. R. Vijaya and M. S. Malathi. It was released on 24 September 1965.

Plot 
A young prince, Prathaban who, when he is about to be crowned, is denied the kingdom by some conspirators who alleges that he is an imposter and there is another true prince. Prathaban vows that he will prove his claim and goes in search of his identity. He meets a mystic who gives him a talisman. One day when Prathaban was sleeping in an abandoned building, he meets a spirit. He believes it is the spirit of his dead mother and keeps it inside the talisman. But someone takes away the talisman. Prathaban continues his journey and on his way meets a girl, Anandhi and they fall in love. It turns out that Anandhi is a princess. Prathaban is imprisoned for loving Anandhi. How he establishes his identity and regains his Kingdom forms the rest of the story.

Cast 
List adapted from the database of Film News Anandan and from the film's song book.

Male Cast
C. L. Anandan
Ravichandran
Rajavelu
Parthiban

Female cast
K. R. Vijaya
M. S. Malathi
Kalpana Devi
Vimala

Guest artistes
R. S. Manohar
Nagesh
Manorama

Production 
The film was produced by Maa. Raa., a popular writer who also directed and wrote the story and dialogues. K. Jagannathan and D. Subramaniam also joined Maa. Raa. as producers. Cinematography was handled by M. Karnan while R. Devarajan was in charge of editing. T. S. Rangasamy was in charge of audiography. Art direction was by Angamuthu and choreography was done by Chinnilal, Sampathkumar, Rajkumar and Jayaraman. The film was shot at Sharadha Studios.

Soundtrack 
Music was composed by R. Parthasarathy, while the lyrics were penned by Vaali and Thellur Dharmarajan.

Reception 
The Indian Express wrote, "Not only the story, which is a costume fantasy but even the style of acting too reminds one of conventions now obsolete." Kalki called it a waste of time.

References

External links 
 

1960s historical drama films
1960s Tamil-language films
Indian historical drama films